In organized labor, a hiring hall is an organization, usually under the auspices of a labor union, which has the responsibility of furnishing new recruits for employers who have a collective bargaining agreement with the union.  It may also refer to a union hall, or the office from which the union may conduct its activities.
A hiring hall in the Construction trades does not offer "new recruits for Employers".  A Hiring Hall is more fairly described as a hub where experienced Employees or workers move between Employers.  Whether they quit, were laid off or fired, they are seeking work from contractors in need of Employees.  It is called a Hiring Hall for a reason and not a Referral Hall. 

The employer's use of the hiring hall may be voluntary, or it may be compulsory by the terms of the employer's contract with the union (or, in a few cases, the labor laws of the jurisdiction in question). Compulsory use of a hiring hall effectively turns employers into a closed shop because employees must join the union before they can be hired. This is the primary argument against the practice, since it disallows non-union workers to gain employment.

Arguments in favor of the institution include that the presence of a hiring hall places the responsibility on the union to ensure that its members are suitably qualified and responsible individuals before assigning them to an employer. The union will often enforce a basic code of conduct among its members to ensure smooth operation of the hiring hall (to prevent members from double-booking, for example). If a hiring hall is reputable, the relationship between the union and the employer can be relatively harmonious. There are arguments that this actually benefits contractors who hire employees for the duration of a specific job.  This is primarily due to the union handling qualifications and other eligibility requirements.  Additionally, the union will also maintain employment records on the individual, meaning that behavior issues from other employers can be documented and reacted to. Thus there is a strong incentive to maintain good conduct to keep union membership. Workers benefit from having a more stable source of benefits such as insurance and pension plans. Contractors are still responsible for paying into these plans, but union members are more protected from lapses in coverage.

The prevalence of compulsory hiring hall arrangements in Canada varies from trade to trade and from province to province, since labor law there is under provincial jurisdiction. The situation in Europe also varies from country to country.

Hiring halls are generally most prevalent in skilled trades and where employers need to find qualified recruits on short notice.

See also
 Closed shop
 Employment agency

Trade unions
Criticism of trade unions
Recruitment
Temporary employment
Employment agencies